The MAZ-7917 is a Soviet and Russian army 14×12 Twelve-wheel drive transporter-erector-launcher designed and developed by the Minsk Automobile Plant (MAZ) in Belarus.

Developed primarily for use as a Topol ICBM mobile launcher, the earlier MAZ-7912 is similar in design to the MAZ-547A but has seven axles instead of six, including one dead axle.

See also 
MAZ-7310
KAMAZ-7850

External links
  http://denisovets.ru/maz/mazpages/maz7917.html

Military vehicles of the Soviet Union
Self-propelled rocket launchers
Missile launchers
Military vehicles introduced in the 1990s